The El Monte City School District is in El Monte, California. It includes 14  elementary schools:  eight serving grades K-6, and six serving grades K-8. The district also administers four Head Start sites, which are located at the elementary schools. Current district board members include Lisette I. Mendez, Beth Rivas, Julia Ruedas, David Siegrist, and Jennifer Cobian.

Schools
Cherrylee Elementary School
Cleminson Elementary School
Columbia Elementary School
Cortada Elementary School
Durfee/Thompson Elementary School
Gidley Elementary School
Frank M. Wright Elementary School
Legore Elementary School
New Lexington Elementary School
Portrero Elementary School
Rio Hondo Elementary School
Rio Vista Elementary School
Shirpser Elementary School
Wilkerson Elementary School

References

External links
 

School districts in Los Angeles County, California
El Monte, California